Jamie Reid (born August 10, 1983) is a female backstroke swimmer from the United States, who won the gold medal in the women's 100m backstroke event at the 2003 Pan American Games. She is a native of Balboa, Panama and competed for the Highlander Aquatic Club in Orlando, Florida.

References
 Profile

1983 births
Living people
American female backstroke swimmers
Swimmers at the 2003 Pan American Games
Sportspeople from Puyallup, Washington
Medalists at the FINA World Swimming Championships (25 m)
Pan American Games gold medalists for the United States
Pan American Games medalists in swimming
Medalists at the 2003 Pan American Games
21st-century American women